In statistics, the studentized range, denoted q, is the difference between the largest and smallest data in a sample normalized by the sample standard deviation.
It is named after William Sealy Gosset (who wrote under the pseudonym "Student"), and was introduced by him in 1927. 
The concept was later discussed by Newman (1939), Keuls (1952), and John Tukey in some unpublished notes.
Its statistical distribution is the studentized range distribution, which is used for multiple comparison procedures, such as the single step procedure Tukey's range test, the Newman–Keuls method, and the Duncan's step down procedure, and establishing confidence intervals that are still valid after data snooping has occurred.

Description 
The value of the studentized range, most often represented by the variable q, can be defined based on a random sample x1, ..., xn from the N(0, 1) distribution of numbers, and another random variable s that is independent of all the xi, and νs2 has a χ2 distribution with ν degrees of freedom. Then

 

has the Studentized range distribution for n groups and ν degrees of freedom. In applications, the xi are typically the means of samples each of size m, s2 is the pooled variance, and the degrees of freedom are ν = n(m − 1).

The critical value of q is based on three factors:
α (the probability of rejecting a true null hypothesis)
n (the number of observations or groups) 
ν (the degrees of freedom used to estimate the sample variance)

Distribution 

If X1, ..., Xn are independent identically distributed random variables that are normally distributed, the probability distribution of their studentized range is what is usually called the studentized range distribution. Note that the definition of q does not depend on the expected value or the standard deviation of the distribution from which the sample is drawn, and therefore its probability distribution is the same regardless of those parameters.

Studentization

Generally, the term studentized means that the variable's scale was adjusted by dividing by an estimate of a population standard deviation (see also studentized residual). The fact that the standard deviation is a sample standard deviation rather than the population standard deviation, and thus something that differs from one random sample to the next, is essential to the definition and the distribution of the Studentized data. The variability in the value of the sample standard deviation contributes additional uncertainty into the values calculated. This complicates the problem of finding the probability distribution of any statistic that is studentized.

See also
Studentized range distribution
Tukey's range test

References

Further reading 

 Pearson, E.S.; Hartley, H.O. (1970) Biometrika Tables for Statisticians, Volume 1, 3rd Edition, Cambridge University Press. 
 John Neter, Michael H. Kutner, Christopher J. Nachtsheim, William Wasserman (1996) Applied Linear Statistical Models, fourth edition, McGraw-Hill, page 726.
 John A. Rice (1995) Mathematical Statistics and Data Analysis, second edition, Duxbury Press, pages 451–452.
 Douglas C. Montgomery (2013) "Design and Analysis of Experiments", eighth edition, Wiley, page 98.

Summary statistics
Multiple comparisons
Statistical ratios